The 2005 FIFA Beach Soccer World Cup qualification playoffs for (UEFA) was a special, one-off beach soccer tournament to determine the fourth European nation that would be competing in the 2005 FIFA Beach Soccer World Cup. The tournament started two days before the start of the world cup, ending the day before the opening match, from May 6 - May 7, 2005, in Rio de Janeiro, Brazil. The winners of the playoffs were Spain.

Overview
Three nations had already confirmed their places in the world cup by finishing first, second and third in the 2004 Euro Beach Soccer League, being France, Portugal and the Ukraine. The teams who finished in fourth, fifth, sixth and seventh were called back to compete for the final place at the world cup, however seventh place Belgium declined the invitation to participate, so eighth place Austria competed instead.

Participating nations
 (4th)
 (5th)
 (6th)
 (7th, declined invite)
 (8th)

Knockout stage
The nations played in a simple knockout format, starting with the semi-finals.

Semi-finals

Third place play off

Final

Winners

Final standings

Nations qualifying for the world cup
 (1st, Euro Beach Soccer League)
 (2nd, Euro Beach Soccer League)
 (3rd, Euro Beach Soccer League)
 (Playoff winners)

References

Qualification (Uefa)
2005 in beach soccer
FIFA Beach Soccer World Cup qualification (UEFA)